A turning basin, winding basin or swinging basin is a wider body of water, either located at the end of a ship canal or in a port to allow cargo ships to turn and reverse their direction of travel, or to enable long narrow barges in a canal to turn a sharp corner. 

For a complete 180-degree turnaround, the width of the basin must be more than the length of the longest vessel normally traversing the waterway. Onboard bow thrusters or tugboats may assist in manoeuvering the ship. 

In seaports the turning basins is often not a real physical basin, but a designated area in the harbour basin where turning is possible and mooring is prohibited. In the example from Gdynia the plan is to enlarge the existing turning basin by removing a part of an existing quay (shown in red in the image).

Examples

References

See also
 Canal basin
 Winding hole

Water transport infrastructure